Events from the year 1944 in Ireland.

Incumbents
 President: Douglas Hyde
 Taoiseach: Éamon de Valera (FF)

Events
26 January – W. T. Cosgrave officially resigns as leader of Fine Gael.
10 March – The United States alleges that Ireland's neutrality is operating in favour of the Axis Powers.
13 March – The British government bans all travel between Great Britain and Ireland.
22 March – Cymric (Capt. C. Cassidy) lost between Ardrossan and Lisbon: 11 dead.
30 March – first Dunnes Stores opens. 
1 June – 1944 Irish general election: The ruling Fianna Fáil under Éamon de Valera gains a majority of 14 seats over all other parties. Members of the 12th Dáil assemble on 9 June.
7 June – The Minister for Supplies, Seán Lemass, announces further rationing of electricity.
21 July – Irish Fir (Capt, J.P. Kelly) reports a 'near miss' torpedo attack in North Atlantic.
22 August – Men from Tyrone and Fermanagh form an Anti-Partition League in Dublin.
29 November – The Chief Genealogical Officer issues County Dublin with a coat of arms, the first county to receive such a distinction.
30 November – General Eoin O'Duffy, former leader of the Blueshirts, dies aged 52 in Dublin.
Dr. John Dignan, Roman Catholic Bishop of Clonfert, publishes Social Security: Outlines of a Scheme of National Health Insurance.
Dr. James Deeny is appointed Chief Medical Officer.

Arts and literature
January – The White Stag group stages an exhibition of Subjective Art in Dublin.
28 August – Joseph Tomelty's play The End House (dealing with the Special Powers Act in Northern Ireland) is premièred at the Abbey Theatre, Dublin.
John M. Feehan founds the successful Cork-based publishing house Mercier Press.
John Lynch's De praesulibus Hiberniae (written 1672) is first published, in Dublin.
Frank O'Connor's short story collection Crab Apple Jelly is published.

Sport

Football

GAA All Ireland Football
Winners: Roscommon GAA
League of Ireland
Winners: Shelbourne
FAI Cup
Winners: Shamrock Rovers 3–2 Shelbourne.

Golf
Irish Open is not played due to The Emergency.

Births
2 January – Martin Drennan, Roman Catholic Bishop of the Diocese of Galway and Kilmacduagh.
5 January
Ivan Cooper, co-founder of the SDLP (NI) (died 2019).
Edward Haughey, Baron Ballyedmond, businessman and senator (killed in helicopter accident in England 2014).
Louis Stewart, jazz guitarist (died 2016)
7 January – Joe McGowan, historian, folklorist and author.
8 February – Brian Farrell, Roman Catholic bishop in the Roman Curia.
22 February – Richard Higgins, Roman Catholic Titular Bishop of the Casae Calanae and an Auxiliary Bishop of the Archdiocese for the Military Services, USA.
10 April – Leo O'Reilly, Bishop of Kilmore (1998–2018).
8 May – Paddy O'Hanlon, barrister and SDLP politician (died 2009).
21 May
Gerry Murphy, soccer coach.
Mary Robinson, first female President of Ireland (1990–1997), United Nations High Commissioner for Human Rights (1997–2002).
24 May
Ruth Dudley Edwards, historian.
Raymond Field, Roman Catholic Auxiliary Bishop in the Archdiocese of Dublin.
25 May – Tom Munnelly, folk-song collector (died 2007).
27 May – Hugh Lambert, journalist and editor (died 2005).
30 May – Liam Naughten, Fine Gael politician, Cathaoirleach of Seanad Éireann from 1995 until his death (died 1996).
1 June
Paul Coghlan, Fine Gael Senator.
Seymour Crawford, Fine Gael TD for Cavan–Monaghan.
5 June – Colm Wilkinson, singer and actor.
6 June – Paul Connaughton Snr, Fine Gael TD for Galway East.
29 June – Seán Doherty, Fianna Fáil TD and Cabinet Minister (died 2005).
3 July – Tim O'Malley, Progressive Democrats TD.
17 July – Vincent Browne, journalist, RTÉ broadcaster.
31 July – David Norris, member of the Seanad representing Dublin University, founder of Campaign for Homosexual Law Reform (born in Belgian Congo).
3 August – Pearse Lyons, biochemist and businessman (died 2018 in the United States).
7 August – Brendan McWilliams, meteorologist and science writer (died 2007).
9 August – Seán Barrett, Fine Gael TD, cabinet minister and Ceann Comhairle of Dáil Éireann.
17 August – Peter Kelly, Fianna Fáil TD for Longford–Roscommon, later Longford–Westmeath (died 2019).
1 September
Pat Upton, Labour Party TD (died 1999).
Eamonn Walsh, Auxiliary Bishop of Dublin (1990– ).
9 September – Bernard Allen, Fine Gael TD for Cork North-Central.
24 September – Eavan Boland, poet (died 2020).
1 October – Emmet Stagg, Labour Party TD for Kildare North.
16 October – Paul Durcan, poet.
19 October – Liam Lawlor, Fianna Fáil politician, resigned following a finding that he had failed to co-operate with a planning irregularities investigation (died 2005).
30 November – John Boland, senior Fine Gael politician (died 2000).
22 December – Patrick Nee, mobster and author in the United States.
28 December – Noel Ahern, Fianna Fáil, TD for Dublin North-West and Minister of State at the Department of Finance with special responsibility for the Office of Public Works.
Full date unknown
Dermot Gallagher, civil servant and diplomat (died 2017).
Tom Garvin, political scientist and historian.
Tom Walsh, Kilkenny hurler.

Deaths
16 February – Mainie Jellett, abstract painter (born 1897).
19 February – J. J. "Ginger" O'Connell, officer in the Irish Volunteers and Irish Defence Forces (born 1887).
15 March – Thomas Byrne, recipient of the Victoria Cross for gallantry in 1898 at the Battle of Omdurman, Sudan (born 1866).
25 April – Tony Mullane, Major League Baseball player (born 1859).
12 May – Edel Quinn, lay missionary (born 1907).
10 June – Frank Ryan, member of the Irish Republican Army, editor of An Phoblacht, leftist activist and leader of Irish volunteers on the Republican side in the Spanish Civil War (born 1902).
August – Noble Huston, Presbyterian minister and dog breeder.
19 September – David Lord, Royal Air Force pilot, posthumous recipient of the Victoria Cross for gallantry at Arnhem (born 1913).
6 November – Walter Guinness, 1st Baron Moyne, British politician and businessman, assassinated in Cairo by the Zionist group Lehi (Stern Gang) (born 1880).
28 November – Sir William Moore, 1st Baronet, Unionist MP and Lord Chief Justice of Northern Ireland 1925–1937 (born 1864).
30 November – Eoin O'Duffy, first leader of Fine Gael and the Blueshirts, leader of Irish volunteers on the Nationalist side of the Spanish Civil War (born 1892).
1 December – Charlie Kerins, Chief of Staff of the IRA, convicted of murder of Garda Síochána officer and hanged (born 1918).

References

 
1940s in Ireland
Ireland
Independent Ireland in World War II
Years of the 20th century in Ireland